Pleasant Camp may refer to:

 Pleasant Camp, British Columbia, hamlet in Atlin District
 Pleasant Camp (Haines, Alaska), historic frontier police outpost